Bahçeşehir Muhsin Ertuğrul Theatre is a theatre venue located in Bahçeşehir quarter of Başakşehir district in Istanbul, Turkey. It is owned and operated by Başakşehir Municipality. The theatre is named in honor of the Turkish stage actor and director Muhsin Ertuğrul (1892–1979).

The theatre is situated in 2. Kısım neighborhood of Bahçeşehir, a satellite town of Istanbul. The theatre's audience hall occupies , and has a total seating capacity of 318, including 70 seats in a second level gallery that serves the theatre balcony.

The stage is named after Haldun Dormen (born 1928), a Turkish actor and film director, who contributed much to the establishment of this theatre.

See also
 Harbiye Muhsin Ertuğrul Stage, a theatre in Harbiye, Istanbul
 Muhsin Ertuğrul Stage, a theatre in Mamak, Ankara

References

External links

Theatres in Istanbul
Başakşehir